Albert Lee (born 1943) is an English guitarist.

Albert Lee may also refer to:

 Albert G. Lee (1879–1967), British radio pioneer
 Albert Lee (bishop), Anglican bishop
 Albert Lindley Lee (1834–1907), American military officer
 Albert Lee (accountant) (1910–1982), Michigan Auditor General
 Albert Lee (Australian Paralympian) (born 1962), Paralympic sitting volleyball player

See also
 Albert Lea, Minnesota, town
Bert Lee (disambiguation)
Al Lee, American actor, producer and manager in vaudeville and silent films